Azmat Khan is an American journalist and winner of a 2022 Pulitzer Prize for international reporting. She is the Patti Cadby Birch Assistant Professor at the Columbia University Graduate School of Journalism. She is the inaugural Director of the Simon and June Li Center for Global Journalism. 

Her investigative report in The New York Times titled "Hidden Pentagon Records Reveal Patterns Of Failure In Deadly Airstrikes" was called "extraordinary" by WNYC The Takeaway and was the lead article in the Pulitzer Prize-winning coverage.

Her work has also won two National Magazine Awards, two Overseas Press Club awards, the Polk Award, and the Hillman Prize.

Education
Khan has a B.A. degree from the University of Michigan, and was a Clarendon Scholar at the University of Oxford where she gained a M.St. degree. She has also studied at The American University in Cairo.

Career 
In December 2021, Khan's report "Hidden Pentagon Records Reveal Patterns of Failure in Deadly Airstrikes" was published in The New York Times describing how efforts to minimize the civilian death count fell far short of the approach promised by the US military for its use of airstrikes in the war against ISIL. The Times reported that airstrikes against ISIL, as well as in the war in Afghanistan, was marked by 
 
The Times reported that efforts to minimize civilian casualties diminished after President Trump assumed office in 2017, stating 
 
The Times reported that the US military systematically under-reported casualties, providing a total death count of 1,417, when the actual count was significantly higher. The report states that the military made little effort to accurately determine civilian casualties after the airstrikes. The military was also reluctant to divulge information about the casualties, in spite of promises of transparency, and news media were required to make numerous requests under the Freedom of Information Act, and had to repeatedly sue the US military to produce data. This report was among those for which Khan and her colleagues were awarded the 2022 Pulitzer Prize for International Reporting.

 she is writing a book for Random House investigating America's air wars.

Personal life 
Khan traces her roots to Pakistan, but was born and raised in Grand Rapids, Michigan.

References

External links
 Official website

American writers of Pakistani descent
Living people
University of Michigan alumni
Alumni of the University of Oxford
The American University in Cairo alumni
21st-century American women writers
21st-century American journalists
American women journalists of Asian descent
Year of birth missing (living people)